Kondagaon a municipality about 70 kilometers from Jagdalpur city is the headquarter of Kondagaon district in the Indian state of Chhattisgarh. It is the third largest city of Bastar division.  Kondagaon separated from Bastar district on 24 January 2012 and formed as 27th district of the Chhattisgarh state. It is mostly renowned for its bell metal craft and other art forms native to the tribal of Bastar. Also known as the Shilp sheher (lit. craft city) of Chhattisgarh owing to the variety of indigenous crafts produced in the area.

MLA-Sh Mohan Lal Markam (Congress)

Collector- Pushpendra Kumar Meena

SP-Sh Sujit Kumar (IPS)

CEO-Nupur Rashi Panna (IAS)

Background

It has an average elevation of 593 metres (1945 feet).

 India census, Kondagaon had a population of 40,921. Males constitute 50% of the population and females 50%. Kondagaon has an average literacy rate of 64%, higher than the national average of 59.5%: male literacy is 73%, and female literacy is 55%. In Kondagaon, 14% of the population is under 6 years of age.

Kondagaon lies on the NH 30 highway and can be reached from either Raipur or Jagdalpur. Frequent bus services are available to Kondagaon from Raipur and Jagdalpur. The nearest railway station is Jagdalpur. A Helicopter strip was temporarily constructed in the playground adjacent to the government college campus, which is occasionally used in Kondagaon.

The town is known for the foodies, being migrants and settlers from various parts of India including the south and the north. Lala hotel is the oldest hotel in the city operating through post independence era when kondagaon was as much of a small city. Kondagaon is situated on banks of river Narangi.

Industries

Art and Craft 

The Bell Metal Craft practiced by most of the craftsmen in the town and the adjacent villages is a form of almost extinct wax sculpting art. Some of the celebrated craftsmen of the bell-metal art forms are late Dr. Jaidev Baghel (a national awardee), Sushil Sakhuja, Sukchand, Suresh Baghmare etc.

The government endow various schemes and policies to promote these art forms and artisans including sponsoring a select few second or third generation artisans for training in the national institute of design, enabling them to keep abreast with the trends and also widening the scope of their art forms.

Timber 

Kondagaon is famous for timber mills too, as the division hosts one of the largest forest division in the Indian subcontinent.

Tourism 

A couple of hillocks that skirts the eastern outskirts of the town (Kondagaon) have been revamped as a tourist park by the forest department. The park would host relocated common wild animals and fowls of the Bastar region. The major part of the hill is turned into recreational zone.

The Coconut development board located in southern frills of the town is a central government coconut development farm, sprawling across acres of coconut and assorted plantation.

In the Keshkal block of district Kondagaon, more a dozen of waterfalls and few caves have been found out a couple of years ago. Some of the known waterfalls, caves, valleys and archeological sites are:

Waterfalls 
 Katulkasa Waterfall, Honhed

 Bijkudum Waterfall, Uper-murvend
 Umradah Waterfall
 Ling-Darha Waterfall
 Amadarha-1 Waterfall
 Amadarha-2 Waterfall
 Hankhi-kudum Waterfall

 Ghumur Waterfall
 Kudarwahi Waterfall

 |thumb|Satnam dham hathi pahad]] Uperbedi Waterfall
 Mirde Waterfall

 Mutte-Khadka Waterfall
 Cherbeda Waterfall

Caves 
 Alor cave
 Bijkudum cave
 Katthan-gundi cave
Satnam dham hathi pahad

Valleys 
 Keshkal Valley

Archeological sites 
 Gobrahin
 Garh-dhanora
 Amrawati
Manjhingarh

Megalithic sites 
 Umradah (Here rock paintings have been found)
 Hata Pathra (Here rock paintings have been found)
 Lingo-Dhara Waterfall (Here rock paintings have been found)

References

External links
Metal Art of Bastar Video (How to make Lost wax sculptures- Video file)
Metal Art of Bastar Photos

Cities and towns in Kondagaon district